Valentyn Vasylyovych Sylvestrov (born 30 September 1937) is a Ukrainian composer and pianist, who plays and writes contemporary classical music.

Biography
Valentyn Vasylyovych Silvestrov was born on 30 September 1937 in Kyiv, Ukrainian SSR, then part of the Soviet Union.

Silvestrov began private music lessons when he was 15.  After first teaching himself, he studied piano at the Kyiv Evening Music School from 1955 to 1958 whilst at the same time training to become a civil engineer. He attended the Kyiv Conservatory from 1958 to 1964, where he was taught musical composition by Borys Lyatoshynsky, and harmony and counterpoint by Levko Revutsky. He then taught at a music studio in Kyiv.

Silvestrov was a freelance composer in Kyiv from 1970 to 2022, when he fled from Ukraine following the Russian invasion in February. He lives in Berlin.

Musical style
Silvestrov is perhaps best known for his post-modern musical style; some, if not most, of his works could be considered neoclassical and post-modernist. Using traditional tonal and modal techniques, Silvestrov creates a unique and delicate tapestry of dramatic and emotional textures, qualities which he suggests are otherwise sacrificed in much of contemporary music. "I do not write new music. My music is a response to and an echo of what already exists," Silvestrov has said.

In 1974, under pressure to conform to both official precepts of socialist realism and fashionable modernism, and likewise to apologise for his walkout from a composers' meeting to protest the Soviet Union invasion of Czechoslovakia, Silvestrov chose to withdraw from the spotlight. In this period he began to reject his previously modernist style. Instead, he composed Quiet Songs (Тихі Пісні (1977)) a cycle intended to be played in private. Later, after the fall of the Soviet Union, he also began to compose spiritual and religious works influenced by the style of Russian and Ukrainian Orthodox liturgical music. Silvestrov traced his eventual rejection of avant-garde techniques back to his years in the Kyiv Conservatory. When presented one of his radical works Lyatoshynsky asked him: "Do you like this?", and while he replied affirmatively "that question became ingrained in my soul".

Silvestrov's recent cycle for violin and piano, Melodies of Instances (Мелодії Миттєвостей), a set of seven works comprising 22 movements to be played in sequence (and lasting about 70 minutes), is intimate and elusive – the composer describes it as "melodies [...] on the boundary between their appearance and disappearance".

Elements of Ukrainian nationalism occur in some of Silvestrov's works, most notably in his choral work Diptych. This work sets the strongly patriotic words of Taras Shevchenko's 1845 poem Testament (Заповіт), which has a significant national status in Ukraine, and Silvestrov dedicated it in 2014 to the memory of Serhiy Nigoyan, an Armenian-Ukrainian who died in the 2014 Hrushevskoho Street riots and is believed to have been the first Euromaidan casualty that led to the Revolution of Dignity.

Works

Silvestrov's principal and published works include 9 symphonies, poems for piano and orchestra, miscellaneous pieces for chamber orchestra, three string quartets, a piano quintet, three piano sonatas, other piano pieces, chamber music, and vocal music (cantatas, songs, etc.) His works includes:
 Sonatina for piano (1960, revised 1965)
 Piano Quintet (1961)
 Triada for piano (1961)
 Quartetto Piccolo for string quartet (1961)
 Trio for flute, trumpet, and celesta (1962)
 Symphony No.1 (1963, revised 1974)
 Mystery for alto flute and six percussion groups (1964)
 Classical Overture (1964) 
 Spectre for chamber orchestra (1965) 
 Monodia for piano and orchestra (1965) 
 Symphony No.2 for flute, timpani, piano and string orchestra (1965)
 Symphony No.3 "Eschatophony" (1966)
 Poem to the Memory of Borys Lyatoshynsky for orchestra (1968)
 Drama for violin, cello, and piano (1969–1971) 
 Meditation for cello and piano (1972)
 String Quartet No.1 (1974) 
 Thirteen Estrades Songs (1973–1975)
 Quiet Songs (Silent Songs) after Pushkin, Lermontov, Keats, Yesenin, Shevtshenko, et al. for baritone and piano (1974–1975)
 Symphony No.4 for brass instruments and strings (1976)
 Kitsch-Music, cycle of five pieces for piano (1977)
 Forest Music after G. Aigi for soprano horn and piano (1977–1978)
 Postludium for violin solo (1981)
 Postludium for cello and piano (1982)
 Symphony No.5 (1982)
 Ode to the Nightingale, cantata with text by John Keats for soprano and small orchestra (1983)
 Postludium for piano and orchestra (1984)
 Symphony, Exegi Monumentum for baritone and orchestra (1985/87)
 String Quartet No.2 (1988)
 Widmung (Dedication), symphony for violin and orchestra (1990–1991)
 Metamusic, symphonic poem for piano and orchestra (1992)
 Symphony No.6 (1994–1995)
 The Messenger for synthesizer, piano and string orchestra (1996–1997)
 Requiem for Larissa for chorus and orchestra (1997–1999) 
 Epitaph for piano and string orchestra (1999)
 Epitaph L.B. for viola (or cello) and piano (1999)
 Autumn Serenade for chamber orchestra (2000)
 Requiem (2000)
 Hymn 2001 (2001)
 Symphony No.7 (2002–2003)
 Lacrimosa for viola (or cello) solo (2004)
 5 Sacred Songs for SATB choir (2008) 
 5 New Pieces for Violin and Piano (2009) 
 String Quartet No. 3 (2011)
 Symphony No. 8 (2012–2013)
 Prayer for the Ukraine (2014)
 Symphony No. 9 (2019)

Silvestrov has recorded 10 albums on the ECM label.

References

Sources

Further reading

External links
 Short biography and list of works by Silvestrov at Onno van Rijen's Soviet Composers (self-published website)
 

Ukrainian classical composers
1937 births
Living people
Musicians from Kyiv
Recipients of the Shevchenko National Prize
ECM Records artists
Recipients of the Order of Prince Yaroslav the Wise, 4th class
Ukrainian avant-garde